The 1967 2. divisjon was a Norwegian second-tier football league season.

The league was contested by 16 teams, divided into two groups; A and B. The winners of group A and B were promoted to the 1968 1. divisjon. The two lowest placed teams in both groups were relegated to the 3. divisjon.

Overview

Summary
Viking won group A with 22 points. Brann won group B with 20 points. Both teams were promoted to the 1968 1. divisjon.

Tables

Group A

Group B

References

Norwegian First Division seasons
1967 in Norwegian football
Norway
Norway